Messier 65 (also known as NGC 3623) is an intermediate spiral galaxy about 35 million light-years away in the constellation Leo, within its highly equatorial southern half.  It was discovered by Charles Messier in 1780.  With M66 and NGC 3628, it forms the Leo Triplet, a small close group of galaxies.

Discovery
M65 was discovered by Charles Messier and included in his Messier Objects list. However, William Henry Smyth accidentally attributed the discovery to Pierre Méchain in his popular 19th-century astronomical work A Cycle of Celestial Objects (stating "They [M65 and M66] were pointed out by Méchain to Messier in 1780"). This error was in turn picked up by Kenneth Glyn Jones in Messier's Nebulae and Star Clusters. This has since ramified into a number of other books by a variety of authors.

Star formation
The galaxy is low in dust and gas, and there is little star formation in it, although there has been some relatively recently in the arms. The ratio of old stars to new stars is correspondingly quite high. In most wavelengths it is quite uninteresting, though there is a radio source visible in the NVSS, offset from the core by about two arc-minutes. The identity of the source is uncertain, as it has not been identified visually, or formally studied in any published papers.

Interaction with other galaxies
To the eye, M65's disk appears slightly warped, and its relatively recent burst of star formation is also suggestive of some external disturbance. Rots (1978) suggests that the two other galaxies in the Leo Triplet interacted with each other about 800 million years ago. Recent research by Zhiyu Duan suggests that M65 may also have interacted, though much less strongly. He also notes that M65 may have a central bar—it is difficult to tell because the galaxy is seen from an oblique angle—a feature which is suggestive of tidal disruption.

Gallery

See also
 List of Messier objects

References

External links

 SEDS Messier: Spiral Galaxy M65
 
 

Intermediate spiral galaxies
Messier 065
Messier 065
065
Messier 065
06328
34612
Astronomical objects discovered in 1780